Leonardus Achates de Basilea, born Leonhard Agtstein in Basel, was a compositor who worked from 1472 to 1491. He is one of the first to introduce the art of printing books in Italy.

In 1472 he published a folio edition of Virgil in Venice. In the same year, he appears in Vicenza where he seems to have lived most of the time. In the meantime however, editions appeared in Padua and St. Ursus.

Publications
Achates printed books on various subjects, including agriculture, grammar, juristic and theological works. Two of his works are suspected reprints.

Franciscus de Platea: Opus restitutionum, usurarum, excommunicationum, Padua, 1473 (not after 28 July)
Omnibonus Leonicenus: De laudibus eloquentiae and Commentum in Ciceronis Oratorem, Vicenza, 22 December 1476, folio
Pietro de Crescenzi: Ruralia commoda, Vicenza, 1490
Euclid: Elementa in artem geometriae, reprint, 1491, Vicenza
Constantine Lascaris: Grammatica graecolatina, Vicenza, 23 December 1491
Arnoldus de Villa Nova: Tractatus de virtutibus herbarum, Vicenza, 27 October 1491

Sources

Printers of incunabula
15th-century Greek people
Year of birth unknown
Year of death unknown